Boyarsky is a rural locality (a settlement) in Kabansky District, Republic of Buryatia, Russia. The population was 149 as of 2010.

References 

Rural localities in Kabansky District
Populated places on Lake Baikal